The Croydon North West by-election took place on 22 October 1981. It was caused by the death of Conservative Member of Parliament Robert Taylor on 18 June 1981.

The Conservative Party selected John Butterfill, then vice-chairman of Guildford Conservative Association. The Labour Party, the runners-up at the 1979 general election, selected a local councillor, Stanley Boden.

The Liberal Party had come a distant third in 1979, but the by-election came shortly after the formation of the Social Democratic Party (SDP), with whom the Liberals had entered into an electoral pact, the SDP-Liberal Alliance. It was therefore expected that the election would provide a platform for Shirley Williams of the SDP to return to Parliament, having lost her seat in 1979. However, the Liberal Party insisted on their own candidate and selected the lesser known Bill Pitt who had stood in the seat for the previous three general elections and at the time was the London Regional Party Chair.

The then 22-year-old Nick Griffin (who became leader of the British National Party in 1999) stood in his first election in Croydon North West, representing the National Front. Bill Boaks, a road safety campaigner and perennial candidate, was also on the ballot. In total, a record twelve candidates stood, one more than in the 1978 Lambeth Central by-election. This record would be broken at the 1984 Chesterfield by-election.

Pitt duly won the seat on the surge of support for the Alliance and a 24% swing, strengthening the Liberals' hand in negotiations with the SDP.

Results

Aftermath

Pitt's win was the Alliance's first electoral success and delighted Liberal leader David Steel who said that the party had won a greater majority than they had expected. Noting that they seemed to have taken support away from both of the main parties in almost equal measure, Steel stated that "I believe that we are now unstoppable." The political editor of The Glasgow Herald, Geoffrey Parkhouse, said the result "shattered" both Labour and the Conservatives and noted that Margaret Thatcher and Michael Foot would fear that the result reflected the victorious Pitt's claim that the Alliance had "caught the imagination of the voters" and that as consequence there were "no longer any safe seats for Tory or Labour in the country." Parkhouse also thought the result made the Alliance favourites to win the forthcoming by-election in Crosby.

General Election result, 1979

References

External links
British Parliamentary By Elections: Campaign literature from the by-election

See also
List of United Kingdom by-elections

Croydon North West by-election
Croydon North West by-election
Croydon North West by-election
Croydon North West,1981
Croydon North West,1981